Stefan Čavor (born 3 November 1994) is a Montenegrin handball player for HSG Wetzlar and the Montenegrin national team.

References

External links

1994 births
Living people
Montenegrin male handball players
People from Kotor
Expatriate handball players
Montenegrin expatriate sportspeople in Germany
Montenegrin expatriate sportspeople in Hungary
Montenegrin expatriate sportspeople in Slovenia
Montenegrin expatriate sportspeople in Spain
BM Ciudad Real players
HSG Wetzlar players
Liga ASOBAL players
Handball-Bundesliga players